.rs is the Internet country code top-level domain (ccTLD) for Serbia. The domain name registry that operates it is the Serbian National Internet Domain Registry (RNIDS). The letters rs stand for /Република Србија (Republic of Serbia).

It is intended to be used with few restrictions, and it is widely used in Serbia. Because of English words ending with the letters "rs", this domain is also used in the construction of domain hacks,
and websites related to the Rust programming language, in which source code files typically end in .rs.

History 
The former Serbia and Montenegro used the .yu domain when still called the Federal Republic of Yugoslavia. In June 2006 Serbia and Montenegro split into two separate countries. On 8 July 2006 the Serbian Ministry of Science and a group of 34 interested organizations founded the National Internet Domain Registry (RNIDS). On 26 September 2006, the ISO 3166 Maintenance Agency decided to allocate RS as the ISO 3166-1 alpha-2 code for Serbia. IANA assigned .rs as the ccTLD for this country.

The delegation of name servers by IANA started in September 2007. Registration of the .rs domain names commenced on 10 March 2008.

In 2007 ICANN also resolved that RNIDS, the operators of the new .rs domain registry, should temporarily operate the former .yu domain until its eventual abolition on or before 30 September 2009. This allowed a two-year transition period for existing .yu names to transferred either to .rs for Serbia or to .me for Montenegro. The .yu domain finally expired on 30 March 2010.

By 2018, it became convention for sites related to the Rust programming language to use .rs domain names, mimicking the file extension used for Rust source files. 

In August 2018, a Brazilian company began marketing .rs domain names towards entities based in Rio Grande do Sul, which shares the RS two-letter code within Brazil, as well as the BR-RS ISO 3166 code. 
 
On 10 December 2018, .RS TLD started offering full Serbian Latin letters domain registration (together with other letters used by official minorities groups in Serbia) from 10 December 2018 - totalling 67 letters which can be used for a domain name.

Domain structure 
The top-level domain is intended for all interested users. The following second-level domains except in.rs are reserved for legal entities only.
 .co.rs – Corporations
 .org.rs – Civil organizations and associations
 .edu.rs – Educational institutions and organizations (except ac.rs sub-domain)
 .ac.rs – Academic and research network of Serbia (delegated)
 .gov.rs – Government institutions (delegated)
 .in.rs – Personal use

See also 
 .срб, a Cyrillic top-level domain for Serbia.

References

External links 
 RNIDS – Serbian National Internet Domain Registry
 List of Accredited Registrars
 .rs Domain Whois

Country code top-level domains
Communications in Serbia
Internet in Serbia
Communications in Kosovo
Council of European National Top Level Domain Registries members

sv:Toppdomän#R